Bonnie Jean Brown (July 31, 1938 – July 16, 2016) was an American country music singer and member of the Browns, a sibling trio popular in the 1950s and 1960s.

Biography
Bonnie Jean Brown was born July 31, 1938, in Sparkman, Arkansas, to Floyd Iron Brown and Birdie Lee Tuberville Brown. Her parents owned a farm, and her father also worked at a sawmill. While Bonnie was still a child, the family moved to Pine Bluff, Arkansas. In 1955, at age 18, she joined her older siblings Maxine and Jim Ed, who were already performing as a duo, to form the musical trio the Browns. Signed by RCA Victor in 1956, the trio scored their biggest hit when their folk-pop single "The Three Bells" reached No. 1 on the Billboard Hot 100 pop and country charts. The single held the No. 1 spot on the pop charts for 4 weeks, and on the country charts for ten.

After she married Dr. Gene Ring in 1960, she was known as Bonnie Brown Ring.

In 1965, the Browns joined the Grand Ole Opry in Nashville, Tennessee, and disbanded in 1967 after Bonnie had decided to retire from the music business.

Unlike her siblings, Bonnie did not pursue a solo music career after the Browns dissolved, though the trio did reunite twice: in the 1980s, and in 2006 for a TV special Country Pop Legends.

In 2015, the trio was inducted into the Country Music Hall of Fame. Bonnie's brother, Jim Ed Brown, died of cancer June 11, 2015, and Maxine died on 21 January 2019.

Death
On September 28, 2015, Bonnie announced that she had been diagnosed with stage 4 adenocarcinoma right lung cancer. Brown died of the illness on July 16, 2016, fifteen days before her 78th birthday. She was survived by her sister Maxine Brown; and by daughters Kelly Ring, former co-anchor of the evening news at WTVT-TV in Tampa, Florida, and Robin Ring Shaver of Little Rock. Her husband, Dr. Gene Ring, preceded her in death six months before her passing.

References

External links
 [ The Browns at Allmusic.com]
 The Browns at CMT.com

1938 births
2016 deaths
American women country singers
American country singer-songwriters
People from Dallas County, Arkansas
Singer-songwriters from Arkansas
Country Music Hall of Fame inductees
Deaths from cancer in Arkansas
Country musicians from Arkansas
21st-century American women